Grüner See (Green Lake) is a lake in Styria, Austria in a village named Tragöß, which is part of the municipality Tragöß-Sankt Katharein. The lake is surrounded by forests and three mountains: Pribitz (1,579 m), Meßnerin (1,835 m) and Trenchtling (Hochturm) (2,081 m), all part of the Hochschwab Mountains. The name "Green Lake" originated because of its emerald-green water.

However, in spring, when the temperature rises and snow melts, the basin of land below the mountains fills with water. In July, the water begins to recede.

The lake supports a variety of fauna such as snails, water fleas (Daphnia pulex), small crabs, fly larvae, and different species of trout (Salmo). The flora is not abundant because of the rocky bottom of the lake. Furthermore, the lake’s depth is variable since its inflow comes from snowmelt.

The lake was popular among divers who could observe the green meadows in the edge zone of the lake particularly in June when the water is at its highest. A bridge and a bench could also be found underwater. Furthermore, trails and trees could also be seen underwater.

Because of the spike in tourist visits that has occurred and expected damage to this sensitive environment, the use of this lake for all watersports activities has been prohibited since 1 January 2016.

Gallery

References

Further reading

External links 

. Retrieved 18 May 2013.
. Retrieved 10 May 2011.

Lakes of Styria